Tarasyuk or Tarasiuk is an East Slavic and Polish (spelled as Tarasiuk) surname. It is a patronymic surname derived from the given name Taras. Notable people with this surname include:

Borys Tarasyuk
Stanislav Tarasyuk
, high-profile Soviet NKVD functionary

See also
Dave Tarras, a Ukrainian-American klezmer singer born David Tarasiuk

References

Polish-language surnames
East Slavic-language surnames
Patronymic surnames